United Nations Security Council Resolution 354, adopted unanimously on 23 July 1974, was a brief resolution, it reaffirmed the provisions of resolution 353 and demanded that all parties to the fighting in Cyprus to comply immediately with Resolution 353 and to cease fire. Resolution 354 also requested all states to refrain from any action that might further aggravate the situation.

See also
 Cyprus dispute
 History of Cyprus
 List of United Nations Security Council Resolutions 301 to 400 (1971–1976)

References
Text of the Resolution at undocs.org

External links
 

 0354
 0354
Turkish invasion of Cyprus
 0354
July 1974 events